Track Meet, known in Japan as , is a sports video game that was released for the original Game Boy. In Germany the game was released as Litti's Summer Sports (endorsed by Pierre Littbarski).

Gameplay

The game offers seven different events in the spirit of the 1992 Summer Olympic Games in Barcelona, Spain. There are five different opponents to compete against in events like long jump, the 100-meter dash, and weightlifting. Each competitor has his own strengths and weaknesses that either help or hinder his performance on certain events. Once a competitor has more points than his opponents, he becomes the grand champion of the Summer Olympic Games.

Reception
The German video gaming magazine Power Play gave Track Meet an overall rating of 75 out of a possible 100 points.

References

External links
Track Meet at Defunct Games
Track Meet at GB no Game Seiha Shimasho 

1991 video games
Game Boy-only games
Interplay Entertainment games
Summer Olympic video games
Video games scored by George Sanger
Video games set in 1992
Video games set in Spain
Barcelona in fiction
Multiplayer and single-player video games
Game Boy games
Video games developed in the United States